Traquair is a village in Scotland.

Traquair may also refer to:

 Isla Traquair (b. 1980), Scottish television host
 Phoebe Anna Traquair (1852–1936), Irish-born artist
 Ramsay Traquair (1840–1912), Scottish palaeontologist
 Ramsay Traquair (architect) (1874–1952), Scottish architect

See also
 Earl of Traquair
 Traquair House